ENSCO provides engineering, science, and advanced technology solutions to government and private sector customers in the aerospace, national security, and surface transportation sectors. ENSCO's corporate headquarters are physically located in Ravensworth, Virginia, with a Springfield postal address.

Products and services
The company provides products and services that support and protect systems, assets, and personnel in surface transportation, aerospace, and national security programs. These capabilities include:

 AI/Machine Learning
 Cybersecurity
 Systems Engineering & Integration
 CBRNE Modeling and Simulation
 Seismology
 Meteorology
 Research & Testing
 Training
 Human Machine Interface
 Human Presence Detection
 Independent Verification & Validation
 Position Navigation and Timing (PNT)
 Machine Vision Track Imaging Systems
 Track Geometry Data Analysis
 Autonomous Vehicle & Track Monitoring Systems
 Track Maintenance Planning
 Railway Safety Research and Development

Management of the Transportation Technology Center 
In October 2022, ENSCO was given operational control of the Transportation Technology Center (TTC) in Pueblo, CO by the Federal Railroad Administration (FRA). Along with maintaining the facilities, ENSCO conducts and oversees research, testing, engineering, and training on the site. ENSCO was tasked with expanding the TTC's capabilities to include all of surface transportation, including trucking, pipeline, and hyperloop.

Previous Presidents

History
The company was established by Dr. Paul W. Broome in 1969.

In 1970, ENSCO won their first contract from the FRA to provide research and track inspection systems for maintenance and safety.

In 1976, ENSCO began conducting highway safety research into lighting, signs, barriers, and pavement, including operating a full-scale crash test facility for the Federal Highway Administration.

In 1982, Francesco A. Calabrese became president of the company.

In 1983, ENSCO opened offices in Owego, NY, focused on providing software services, including design, development, documentation, and testing for military and commercial standards.

In 1989, ENSCO began supporting the United States’ Eastern Launch Range, providing independent evaluations of mission-critical software for successful launches and to protect life.

In 1992, NASA selected ENSCO to provide research on the impact of weather on ground operations, launch, and landing of space shuttles.

In 1992, ENSCO created a state-of-the-art grading and inspection system that automated the inspection of everything from lumber and baggage to food and weapons.

In 1995, The American Railway Engineering Association approved ENSCO’s Gage Restraint Measurement System as the only system that met standards for use of technology in railroad inspection.

In 1996, ENSCO began exploring techniques for tracking and location that did not rely on GPS receivers.

In 1996, ENSCO created a first-of-its-kind early warning system to protect against chemical, biological, radiological, and nuclear attacks.

In 1997, Broome retired as chief executive officer of the company.

In 1998, ENSCO developed solutions for improved manufacturing and flight control using customer and commercially available tools.

In 2005, the company was hired by United Airlines to generate weather forecasts.

Also in 2005, the company opened an office in Watervliet, New York.

In 2011, the company opened an office in Montreal, its first international operation, to service the avionics market.

In April 2011, the company acquired the IData and IGL 178 product lines from Quantum3D.

In April 2013, the company was awarded a contract by Bombardier to provide wheel sets and testing services in support of Bombardier's design and build of new railcars for the San Francisco Bay Area Rapid Transit District.

In October 2014, Boris Nejikovsky was named president of the company.

In July 2015, the company received a contract to build a track inspection vehicle for Roy Hill Infrastructure in Western Australia. The company also received a contract to equip two Canadian National Railway hi-rail vehicles with both a track geometry measurement system and a machine vision joint bar inspection system.

In August 2015, the company was awarded a contract by Genesee & Wyoming for a paperless track inspection device.

In January 2016, the company opened an office in Perth.

In March 2017, the company was awarded a $74 million contract by the United States Air Force to provide modeling software and engineering support.

In April 2017, the company was awarded a contract by the Federal Railroad Administration for the Automated Track Inspection Program.

In January 2018, Paul W. Broome, the founder of the company, died.

In March 2021 ENSCO was awarded a US$571 million contract to manage the Transportation Technology Center (TTC) in Pueblo, Colorado; the transition from the former contractor, Transportation Technology Center, Inc., was completed in October 2022. The contract has a five-year base period and three five-year renewal options. ENSCO also announced the formation of the Center for Surface Transportation Testing and Academic Research (C-STTAR) consortium, including eight universities and academic research centers, to assist with research "across all modes of surface transportation" at TTC. Other members of the C-STTAR consortium include:

 Center for Urban Transportation Research (at University of South Florida, consortium lead)
 Colorado State University–Pueblo
 University of Hawaii
 Michigan State University
 Michigan Tech
 Mineta Transportation Institute (at San Jose State University)
 University of Nebraska
 Oregon State University

Corporate affairs
The corporate headquarters are physically located in the Ravensworth census-designated place in unincorporated Fairfax County, Virginia, with a Springfield postal address.

The headquarters were formerly physically located in Annandale CDP in unincorporated Fairfax County, with a Falls Church postal address.

Notes

1969 establishments in Virginia
Aerospace companies of the United States
Companies based in Fairfax County, Virginia
Construction and civil engineering companies established in 1969
Defense companies of the United States
Engineering companies of the United States
Falls Church, Virginia
Privately held companies based in Virginia
Transport safety organizations